Lacewood is a common name for the wood produced from a number of different trees, with mostly a striking appearance of their "lace-wood“, which gets its name from the lace like pattern: These include:
 Allanblackia floribunda, Allanblackia parviflora, West African trees
 Cardwellia sublimis, an Australian tree
 Elaeocarpus bojeri, "bois dentelle", due to the unique patterns of its flowers
 Euplassa pinnata, Euplassa cantareirae, trees from northeastern South america
 Firmiana papuana, a tree from New Guinea 
 Grevillea robusta, an East Australian tree
 Lagetta lagetto, a Caribbean tree, lacebark tree, lace tree, "bois dentelle", the inner bark is formed of reticulated fibres so as to resemble a coarse kind of lace.
 Macadamia spp., Australian trees
 Monoon oblongifolium (Syn.: Polyalthia oblongifolia) Mempisang, a Philppinean tree, yellow lacewood 
 Platanus spp.; Platanus occidentalis American sycamore, Platanus × hispanica London plane 
 Panopsis spp.; Panopsis rubescens and Panopsis sessilifolia 
 Roupala montana, Roupala cordialis Leopardwood, brazilian lacewood, South American lacewood, Ropala lacewood
 Sterculia shillinglawii, a tree from New Guinea

Uses

References

See also 
 Lacebark 
 Lacebark tree

Wood